is a Japanese football player who plays for FC Machida Zelvia.

Club statistics

1Includes J2/J3 Playoffs.

References

External links

Profile at FC Machida Zelvia

1984 births
Living people
People from Inzai
Association football people from Chiba Prefecture
Japanese footballers
J1 League players
J2 League players
J3 League players
Japan Football League players
Nagoya Grampus players
Mito HollyHock players
Kashiwa Reysol players
FC Gifu players
FC Machida Zelvia players
Tokyo Verdy players
Association football defenders